Kaunik Acharya was an Indian cricketer who played for Himachal Pradesh. Acharya's made two first-class appearances for the side, during the 1991–92 season, his debut coming against Delhi, against whom he scored 8 and 15, and took one catch, that of centurion Bhaskar Pillai. Acharya's second and final appearance came the following week, against Haryana, a match which also finished in an innings defeat for Himachal Pradesh, in which he scored 28 runs in the first innings in which he batted, and a duck in the second.

References

Indian cricketers
Himachal Pradesh cricketers
Living people
Year of birth missing (living people)